Mount Coleman may refer to:

Mount Coleman (Alberta)
Mount Coleman (Antarctica)

See also
Coleman Peak